Hermanniidae is a family of oribatids in the order Oribatida. There are at least 3 genera and 80 described species in Hermanniidae.

Genera
 Galapagacarus P. Balogh, 1985
 Hermannia Nicolet, 1855
 Neohermannia Bayoumi & Mahunka, 1979

References

Further reading

 
 
 
 

Acariformes
Acari families